Dysphania graveolens, common name fetid goosefoot, is a plant found from Utah, Arizona and west Texas to Guatemala, Peru and northwest Argentina. It has been introduced elsewhere including the east coast of the United States (Maine, Massachusetts and New York state). It has many synonyms, including Chenopodium graveolens and Dysphania incisa. In 2021, the correct name in Dysphania was said to be Dysphania graveolens, although , Plants of the World Online accepted the unpublished name Dysphania incisa.

Uses
The Zuni people steep the plant in water and inhale the vapor to treat headaches.

References

incisa
Flora of Northwest Argentina
Flora of Arizona
Flora of Bolivia
Flora of central Chile
Flora of Guatemala
Flora of Mexico
Flora of New Mexico
Flora of Peru
Flora of Texas
Flora of Utah
Plants used in traditional Native American medicine
Plants described in 1809
Flora without expected TNC conservation status